

Highest-grossing films

List of films
A list of films produced in Japan in 2008 (see 2008 in film).

External links
 Japanese films of 2008 at the Internet Movie Database
 2008 in Japan
 2008 in Japanese television
 List of 2008 box office number-one films in Japan

2008
Lists of 2008 films by country or language
Films